Sun Sportsland Kyowa Gymnasium (サンスポーツランド協和体育館) is an indoor sporting arena located in Kyowa, Daisen, Akita, Japan.  It hosts indoor sporting events such as basketball,  volleyball and table tennis. The Sun Sportsland also has a baseball park, and it is adjacent to the Kyowa Civic Center Wapia.

Facilities
Main arena 
Running course
Training space

References 

Sports venues in Akita Prefecture
Indoor arenas in Japan
Basketball venues in Japan
Daisen, Akita